Half-Wits Holiday is a 1947 short subject directed by Jules White starring American slapstick comedy team the Three Stooges (Moe Howard, Larry Fine and Curly Howard in his final starring role). It is the 97th entry in the series released by Columbia Pictures starring the comedians, who released 190 shorts for the studio between 1934 and 1959.

Plot
In the second Stooge adaptation of the 1913 play Pygmalion by George Bernard Shaw, the trio are repairmen who make a scene in the presence of two psychologists, Professors Quackenbush (Vernon Dent) and Sedletz (Ted Lorch). Quackenbush makes a bet with Sedletz that he can turn the boys into gentlemen through environment. Training is slow and painful for the professor, who pulls his hair out in disgust. The Stooges take the opportunity to flirt with the professor's daughter Lulu (Barbara Slater) while learning proper table etiquette. Finally, the winner of the wager will be decided by the boys' behavior at a fancy society party.

The party goes awry. Curly greets guest Mrs. Smythe-Smythe (Symona Boniface) by kissing her hand and biting off the diamond in her ring. Realizing this, Moe and Larry take Curly to a secluded area to lecture him, only to find that Curly has taken a large handful of silverware as well.

Curly grabs a pie from a pastry table and tries to eat it whole. Moe sees this, swipes the pie, and pushes Curly out of the way (the moment when Curly leaves the stage for the last time as a Stooge before suffering a stroke that would come to end his career). Seeing the approaching Mrs. Smythe-Smythe, Moe tosses the pie straight up, and it sticks to the ceiling. Noticing his nervousness and frequent upward glances, she sympathetically comments, "young man, you act as if the Sword of Damocles is hanging over your head." Moe tells Mrs. Smythe-Smythe that she must be psychic and leaves. Bewildered, she looks up to see what had so concerned him and the pie falls onto her face. A pie fight ensues. Quackenbush ultimately loses the bet to Sedletz, believing that he had learned his lesson.

Cast

Credited
 Moe Howard as Moe
 Larry Fine as Larry
 Curly Howard as Curly (final film)
 Vernon Dent as Prof. Quackenbush
 Barbara Slater as Lulu Quackenbush
 Ted Lorch as Prof. Sedletz

Uncredited
 Emil Sitka as Sappington
 Symona Boniface as Mrs. Smythe-Smythe
 Mary Forbes as Countess Shpritzvasser
 Helen Dickson as Mrs. Gotrocks
 Al Thompson as Mr. Toms
 Johnny Kascier as Councilman
 Victor Travers as Sleeping party guest
 Judy Malcolm as Party guest

Production notes
Half-Wits Holiday is a reworking of 1935's Hoi Polloi, without the aid of any stock footage. Half-Wits Holiday would itself later be reworked as 1958's Pies and Guys.

The untimely absence of Curly from the pie fight would prove somewhat helpful when pie-fight footage was later needed. The footage was recycled in Pest Man Wins, Scheming Schemers and Pies and Guys, as well as the compilation feature film Stop! Look! and Laugh.

Curly's departure
Half-Wits Holiday was filmed May 2–6, 1946; it marked the final appearance of outgoing Stooge Curly Howard as an official member of the team. During the final day of filming (May 6), Curly suffered a debilitating stroke on the set and was rushed to a nearby hospital, effectively ending his career.

Curly was to be featured prominently in the pie-fight scene, but after Moe found him with his head slumped on his shoulder and with tears rolling down his eyes, it was apparent that Curly could not perform. Moe alerted director Jules White of Curly's unfortunate situation, leading White to quickly rework the scene to be divided between Moe and Larry. Reaction shots from the supporting cast were spliced in more frequently to hide Curly's absence.

Supporting actor Emil Sitka, who made his debut with the Stooges in this film as the first footman Sappington, remembered:

Aftermath
Even before the day when Curly suffered his debilitating stroke, he had been having problems taking direction from White during filming. Many of the lines intended for Curly were either given to Larry or eliminated altogether.

In the scene where the Stooges have their reflexes checked at the beginning of the short, an ailing Curly noticeably looks to someone off camera,who apparently tells him when to lift his leg or when to stay still, as well as his next line. This is one of many things that Curly needed assistance with. To help with his struggles, Curly was often placed next to his brother, Moe, to help guide him through scenes.

One scene, in particular, took much longer than it should have been filmed due to Curly's health issues, but it did eventually get out albeit somewhat stilted. The Stooges are supposed to behave like proper, dignified gentlemen and communicate fluently when introduced to the wealthy gentry:
Larry: "Delighted."
Moe: "Devastated."
Curly: "Dilapidated."

Larry: "Enchanted."
Moe: "Enraptured."
Curly: "Embalmed."

White later said, "I had a devil of a time getting that scene. Curly just couldn't get the hang of it. I should have realized then that he was deteriorating even further."

External links
 
 
Half-Wits Holiday at threestooges.net

References

1947 films
1947 comedy films
American black-and-white films
The Three Stooges film remakes
Films based on works by George Bernard Shaw
Films directed by Jules White
The Three Stooges films
Columbia Pictures short films
American comedy short films
1940s English-language films
1940s American films